Ptilopsaltis synchorista is a moth of the family Acrolophidae. It is found in Trinidad.

References

Moths described in 1935
Acrolophidae